Teratembiidae is a family of insects in the order Embioptera, the web-spinners. They are distributed in the Nearctic, Neotropical and Afrotropical realms.

Genera include:
Dachtylembia
Diradius
Oligembia
Paroligembia
Teratembia

References

External links

Embioptera
Insect families